Fairfield Geotechnologies is a seismic service company focusing on data licensing and data processing as well as imaging, data analytics and data interpretation. It is headquartered in Houston, Texas.

History
The company was founded in 1976 and immediately began its first 2D transition zone program in Louisiana.

In 1989, it introduced its first, non-exclusive 3D survey.

In April 2005, the company acquired RFTrax.

In 2011, the company sold $30 million of seismic exploration equipment to Apache Corporation.

In April 2018, the company acquired Geokinetics’ U.S. multiclient data library.

In December 2018, the company sold its seismic technologies business and a U.K. subsidiary to Norway’s Magseis ASA for $233 million.

See also
 List of oilfield service companies

References

External links
 

1976 establishments in Texas
Oilfield services companies
Oil companies of the United States
Seismological observatories, organisations and projects